Nguyen Huu Thang or Nguyễn Hữu Thắng may refer to:
 Nguyễn Hữu Thắng (official), former general director of Vietnam Railway Authority (VNRA), a government agency of the Vietnamese Ministry of Transport
 Nguyễn Hữu Thắng (footballer, born 1972), Vietnamese former sweeper and currently manager and coach of Sông Lam Nghệ An F.C.
 Nguyễn Hữu Thắng (footballer, born 1980), Vietnamese midfielder currently playing for Bình Dương F.C.